Gaochun Old Street is located in Gaochun, Nanjing, in China. It is a national AAA level tourist scenic zone. It is  the best-preserved old street from the Chinese Ming and Qing Dynasty in Jiangsu Province.

It has been published as a provincial heritage unit several years ago. It is called Gaochun Chunxi Old Street (Chinese: 高淳淳溪老街) as well. Gaochun has recently been named International Slow-rhythm City which means people living there lead a relatively slow and peaceful life.

It was long originally. The street is lined on both sides with old-styled shops selling goods and services of interest to tourists. There are also other tourist attractions such as the Qianlong Old Well (Chinese: 乾隆老井)and the Guanwang Temple.

References

Tourist attractions in Nanjing
Geography of Nanjing
AAA-rated tourist attractions